Nitrate reductases are enzymes that reduce nitrate to nitrite.

Nitrate reductase may also refer to:

 Nitrate reductase (cytochrome)
 Nitrate reductase (NADH)
 Nitrate reductase (NADPH)
 Nitrate reductase (NAD(P)H)
 Nitrate reductase (quinone)

See also
 Nitrite reductase (disambiguation)

 Biology disambiguation pages